Boulder Junction is an unincorporated census-designated place located in the town of Boulder Junction, Vilas County, Wisconsin, United States. Boulder Junction has a post office with ZIP code 54512. As of the 2010 census, its population was 183.

References

Census-designated places in Vilas County, Wisconsin
Census-designated places in Wisconsin